is a Prefectural Natural Park in central Hyōgo Prefecture, Japan. Established in 1963, the park spans the municipalities of Asago, Himeji, Kamikawa, and Shisō.

See also

 National Parks of Japan

References

Parks and gardens in Hyōgo Prefecture
Protected areas established in 1963
1963 establishments in Japan